Hangzhou Jianqiao Airport, formerly romanized as Chien Chiao, also known as Hangzhou Air Base, is a People's Liberation Army Air Force Base and a former civil airport serving Hangzhou, the capital city of Zhejiang Province, China.  It is located in the town of Jianqiao in Jianggan District, about 7 miles northeast of the city center.  Jianqiao Airport served as Hangzhou's main airport until 29 December 2000, when all commercial flights were transferred to the newly built Hangzhou Xiaoshan International Airport.

History
Jianqiao was developed into an airfield and flight training institute in 1922 under support and directives of the Anhui clique warlord Lu Yongxiang and World War I veteran ace fighter pilot Zhu Binhou, with a squadron of aircraft that included Breguet 14s. Jianqiao air force base was then consolidated in 1931 in wake of the Mukden Incident by the Nationalist Government of the Republic of China , and was a location of major air battles between the Chinese air force and the Imperial Japanese air forces during the Second Sino-Japanese War (1937–45); battles scenes of Jianqiao which were re-enacted in a Taiwanese motion-picture patriotic war drama Heroes of the Eastern Skies (or Heroes of Jianqiao). In 1956 it was converted to a public airport and civil flights started on January 1, 1957.  The airport was expanded in 1971 in preparation for the official visit of President Richard Nixon of the United States.  In 1990 the runway was again lengthened and widened to 3,200 meters long and 50 meters wide.  The airport handled 2,167,400 passengers in 1999, and served 46 routes in 2000 before all civil flights were transferred to the newly built Hangzhou Xiaoshan International Airport.

When Jianqiao Airport serviced commercial flights, it housed the headquarters of Zhejiang Airlines.

See also
List of airports in China
List of People's Liberation Army Air Force airbases
Republic of China Air Force Academy
Heroes of the Eastern Skies

References

1931 establishments in China
1957 establishments in China
Airports established in 1931
Airports established in 1957
Airports in Zhejiang
Defunct airports in China
Buildings and structures in Hangzhou
Chinese Air Force bases
Major National Historical and Cultural Sites in Zhejiang